Oscar Joakim Wendt (born 24 October 1985) is a Swedish professional footballer who plays as a left back for Allsvenskan club IFK Göteborg.

A product of the IFK Skövde youth academy, Wendt started off his professional career with IFK Göteborg in 2003 before signing with FC Copenhagen in 2006. In 2011, he joined Bundesliga club Borussia Mönchengladbach on a free transfer. After ten seasons in Germany, Wendt returned to IFK Göteborg in 2021. A full international between 2007 and 2016, he won 28 caps for the Sweden national team.

Club career

IFK Göteborg
After playing for IFK Skövde, he joined IFK Göteborg in 2003. He became an important first team player, earning 14 appearances on the Swedish U21 team and a call-up for the Swedish national team.

In his time at the club he played 91 matches, before moving to the Danish champions Copenhagen on a four-year contract for 6 million DKK. After his departure to Copenhagen, a huge gap arose in the defence, later filled by Argentine defender José Shaffer coming from Racing Club.

Copenhagen
In his first two years at Copenhagen, he struggled to become a first team regular, first being a back-up for former Norwegian international André Bergdølmo and later Danish international Niclas Jensen. However, in 2008, he managed to become a first choice on the left back position for his team, earning him a call-up to the Swedish national team, his first in over 18 months. His strong performances also had him linked with both English club West Ham United and Italian club Genoa.

With an injured Bergdølmo in Copenhagen's 2006–07 UEFA Champions League campaign, Wendt played regularly as a left back, and in the team's 3–1 win against Celtic, he alongside fellow Copenhagen defender Michael Gravgaard was chosen for the Eurosport "Team of the Round".

Borussia Mönchengladbach
Wendt joined Bundesliga club Borussia Mönchengladbach on a free transfer on 10 June 2011.

Return to IFK Göteborg
On 23 March 2021, it was announced that Wendt would return to IFK Göteborg on a free transfer. Signing a one-and-a-half-year contract, he returned on 1 July 2021.

International career

Having represented Sweden at U17, U19, and U21 levels, Wendt made his senior Sweden debut in January 2007 in a friendly game against Venezuela. Wendt was overlooked for a spot in Sweden's UEFA Euro 2016 squad despite a strong season in Bundesliga. Wendt retired from the national team in March 2017, having represented his country a total of 28 times.

Personal life 
He is the son of former footballer Joakim Wendt, who played two seasons with IFK Göteborg.

Career statistics

Club

International

Honours
Copenhagen
 Danish Superliga: 2006–07, 2008–09, 2009–10, 2010–11
 Danish Cup: 2008–09

References

External links
 
 
 

1985 births
Living people
Footballers from Gothenburg
Association football fullbacks
Swedish footballers
Sweden international footballers
Sweden youth international footballers
Sweden under-21 international footballers
IFK Göteborg players
F.C. Copenhagen players
Borussia Mönchengladbach players
Allsvenskan players
Danish Superliga players
Bundesliga players
Swedish expatriate footballers
Expatriate men's footballers in Denmark
Expatriate footballers in Germany